Japanese given name. Although the name can be given to both sexes, it is more commonly used by females.

Possible writings
Harumi can be written using different kanji characters and can mean:
晴美, "sunny, beauty"
晴海, "sunny, sea"
晴実, "sunny, fruit"
春美, "spring, beauty"
春海, "spring, sea"
春実, "spring, fruit"
治美, "govern, beauty"
The name can also be written in hiragana or katakana.

People
Edo Harumi (はるみ, born 1964), Japanese comedian
Harumi Fujita (晴美; born 1961), Japanese composer
Harumi Fujita (archaeologist), (はるみ), Japanese archaeologist
Harumi Hanayagi (はるみ; 1896–1962), Japanese actress
Harumi Honda (born 1963), Japanese track cyclist
Harumi Hiroyama (晴美; born 1968), Japanese long-distance runner
Harumi Ikoma (治美), a Japanese voice actress and narrator
, Japanese cross-country skier
Harumi Inoue (晴美; born 1974), Japanese actress
Harumi Kohara (born 1965), Japanese badminton player
Harumi Kori (晴己; born 1953), Japanese football player
Harumi Kurihara (はるみ; born 1947), Japanese celebrity homemaker and television personality
Harumi Miyako (はるみ; born 1948), Japanese enka singer
Harumi Nakazato (晴美; born 1962), Japanese sprint canoer
Harumi Nemoto (はるみ; born 1980), Japanese gravure idol
Harumi Sakurai (浩美; born 1982), Japanese voice actress
Harumi Sato (晴美; born 1995), Japanese dancer, model and actress
, Japanese politician
Harumi Tsuyuzaki (born 1974), Japanese singer and songwriter
Harumi Yanagawa, Japanese Paralympic athlete

Places
Harumi, district of Tokyo

Japanese unisex given names